Joanna Zając (born 13 September 1990) is a Polish snowboarder. She was born in Limanowa. She competed in halfpipe at the FIS Snowboarding World Championships 2013. She competed at the 2014 Winter Olympics in Sochi, in halfpipe.

References

External links

1990 births
Living people
People from Limanowa
Snowboarders at the 2014 Winter Olympics
Polish female snowboarders
Olympic snowboarders of Poland
Competitors at the 2015 Winter Universiade
21st-century Polish women